The Sheffield Continental is one of the four flagship named passenger trains operated by East Midlands Railway. There is only a south-bound Sheffield Continental service which is the 0647 train from Sheffield to London St Pancras.

The service started on 15 December 2008 as part of the December 2008 timetable changes. The service was named as part of an East Midlands Trains competition to name two new flagship services. It is named after the ability to change onto Eurostar services to the continent at London St Pancras.

The service is provided by two 5-car Class 222 Meridian trains coupled together to form a 10-car train.

Stations served
As of 2019 the Sheffield Continental  calls at:
Sheffield
Chesterfield
Derby
East Midlands Parkway
Loughborough
Leicester
Kettering
Wellingborough
London St Pancras

Other named trains
East Midlands Railway operate three other named trains called:
Master Cutler
Robin Hood
South Yorkshireman

See also
East Midlands Trains
British Rail Class 222

External links
East Midlands Trains website
National Rail Enquires website – main web portal for UK train fares, times and other travel information

References

Named passenger trains of the United Kingdom
Railway services introduced in 2008